Pie is a surname.  People with the surname include:

Bruce Pie (1902–1961), Australian politician
Christina Pie, American poker player
Félix Pie (born 1985), Dominican baseball player
Jonathan Pie, fictional character created and portrayed by English comedian Tom Walker.
Louis-Édouard-François-Desiré Pie (1815–1880), French Catholic cardinal
Ntot Ngijol Jean Pie (born 1986), Cameroonian footballer
Lao Pie-fang, Chinese general and guerrilla leader during World War II
Pinkie Pie, character in My Little Pony: Friendship is Magic

See also
Pye (surname)